Olga Roriz (born 8 August 1955, in Viana do Castelo) is a Portuguese choreographer and dancer.

Awards
2008 Grande Prémio da Sociedade Portuguesa de Autores
2012 Prémio da Latinidade

References

External links
Official website of the Companhia Olga Roriz

Portuguese female dancers
Portuguese choreographers
1955 births
People from Viana do Castelo
Living people